Robert Day (22 November 1884 – 1 May 1949) was an Irish Labour Party politician and trade union official. 

He was born in Cork City to night watchman John Day and Mary Hogan, one of at least six children. He worked as a laundry van man and was married in October 1912 to laundress Christina O'Connell.

He was elected to Dáil Éireann as a Labour Party Teachta Dála (TD) for the Cork Borough constituency at the 1922 general election. He lost his seat at the 1923 general election.

He died on 1 May 1949 in Cork.

References

External links

1884 births
1949 deaths
Labour Party (Ireland) TDs
Members of the 3rd Dáil
Politicians from County Cork
Irish trade unionists
People of the Irish Civil War (Pro-Treaty side)